The Channel One Cup (formerly Izvestia Trophy) is an annual ice hockey event held in Russia under the auspices of Channel One. It is an open tournament typically composed of various national teams.

History
The tournament started in 1967 in Moscow in the Soviet Union. The first edition of the tournament was held in 1967, in honour of the 50th anniversary of the October Revolution. It was the only time when the tournament was held in different cities at one time, namely in Moscow, Leningrad, and Voskresensk. Six teams participated in that tournament; two Soviet teams, two Czechoslovakian teams, a Canadian team, and a Polish team. Sweden and West Germany declined the invitation. 

The tournament is played in December every year, with the exception of 1974 and 1975 when its matches were spread out during the season. In 1992, the tournament was played in Saint Petersburg, and  some of its matches have been played in other European countries of the participating teams. During the 1970s and 1980s, the cup was often commonly referred to as "The Little World Championships". From 1996 to 2022 it was part of the Euro Hockey Tour.

In 2022, due to the Russian invasion of Ukraine, the tournament was removed from the Euro Hockey Tour. To replace the countries that had pulled out, Kazakhstan and Belarus made their tournament debuts, alongside a second Russian team of players under 25.

Tournament name
The name of the tournament has changed several times during its history:

 International Moscow Tournament (1967–1968)
 Izvestia Trophy (1969–1996)
 Baltica Brewery Cup (1997–2002)
 Moscow International Tournament (2003)
 Rosno Cup (2004–2005)
 Channel One Cup (2006–present)

Results 
Final standings in each event are determined in a round-robin tournament. If teams are tied in points, the standing is determined by the result of the game between the tied teams.

Medal table

References

External links
 Izvestia Trophy 
 Channel One Cup 
 Channel One Cup website on fhr.ru

 
Euro Hockey Tour
Ice hockey tournaments in Europe
International ice hockey competitions hosted by Russia
International ice hockey competitions hosted by the Soviet Union
Sports competitions in Moscow
December sporting events
Recurring sporting events established in 1967
1967 establishments in Russia
Ice hockey events